The trident prickleback (Gymnoclinus cristulatus), is a species of marine ray-finned fish belonging to the family Stichaeidae, the pricklebacks and shannies. It is the only species in the monotypic genus Gymnoclinus. This fish is found in the  Northwestern Pacific Ocean.

References

Chirolophinae
Fish described in 1912
Taxa named by Charles Henry Gilbert
Monotypic fish genera